(), also known as , is a doctrine in Shia Islam positing that some of the dead will return to life before the Resurrection to avenge their oppression.

This doctrine, which was elaborated in the early 10th-century by the then emerging Twelver sect, goes back on earlier ideas developed by early Shia sects such as the late 7th-century  and the early 9th-century , who denied the deaths of Muhammad ibn al-Hanafiyya (died 700) and Musa al-Kazim (died 799) and awaited their return.

The concept was later also used in the Baháʼí Faith (19th century) to designate the cyclical return of the Manifestation of God, which appeared in prophet figures such Jesus or Muhammad, as well as in the Báb (1819–1850) and in Baháʼu'lláh (1817–1892), the two founders of the Baháʼí Faith.

Twelvers believe that their twelfth Imam, Muhammad al-Mahdi, has been concealed by God, though he remains responsible for the affairs of men and their inward spiritual guidance in his state of occultation (874 CE-present). While various sects disagree about the identity of the eschatological Mahdi, the belief in him remains popular among all Muslims, possibly owing to numerous traditions to this effect in canonical Sunni and Shia sources.

Shortly before the Day of Judgment, when commanded by God, Muhammad al-Mahdi will return to lead the forces of righteousness against the forces of evil in an apocalyptic war that would ultimately establish peace and justice on earth, according to the Twelvers. In his mission, al-Mahdi will be assisted by Jesus, who will pray behind al-Mahdi in his Second Coming. Jesus also kills al-Dajjal (antichrist) in some Sunni accounts, though that function is reserved for al-Mahdi in Twelver sources.

In Twelver thought, al-Mahdi is also expected to avenge the injustices suffered by Husayn, grandson of the prophet, whose innocent blood is believed to have plunged the Muslim community into a cycle of violence, corruption, and oppression. This vengeance is necessary, it is said, to rid the Muslim community of the most odious crime ever committed in their name. The purpose of this return is for the oppressed to exact their revenge on their oppressors.

It is generally said that the prophet or the Imams will return to aid in the victory of al-Mahdi. In Shia traditions, particular emphasis is placed on the return of Husayn, who is expected to rule until old age upon his return.

Quran 
In particular, Q27:83 includes the passage, "On the day when We shall muster out of every nation a troop." Verse Q43:61 includes the sentence "He [Jesus] is surely a knowledge of the Hour," which has been connected to the descent of Jesus during the rulership of al-Mahdi and the imminence of the Day of Judgment after his descent. An analogy is often made with verse Q2:243, where God brought to life a group of the children of Israel.

Earlier uses 
Non-Twelver sects of Shia have used the term  to refer to the return of their imams from concealment, including the now-extinct sects of Kaysanite and Waqifite Shia, who denied the deaths of Muhammad ibn al-Hanafiyya (died 700) and Musa al-Kazim (died 799), respectively, and awaited their return.

Baháʼí Faith 

The concept of periodic return of a Manifestation of God is central to prophetology of the Baháʼí Faith, which originated in the 19th century. Baháʼís do not view the return of the prophets and saints of the past as a physical return, or resurrection, but rather a return of spiritual characteristics and archetypal roles. This was developed in a milieu of Shiʽa eschatology, initially by Shaykh Ahmad (1753–1826), considered by Baháʼís to be an inspired predecessor to their own faith. The return of the attributes of God in an individual are expected about every thousand years, and these people are termed Manifestations of God. Jesus and Muhammad are regarded as such, as well as the Báb (1819–1850) and Baháʼu'lláh (1817–1892), the two founders of the Baháʼí Faith. Each prophet is described by Baháʼu'lláh as in a sense the return of every previous prophet. The concept of return is further extended to the companions of the Manifestations of God. For example, Aaron, Saint Peter, Ali, and Quddús are all considered equivalent minor prophets that championed and spread the cause of the major prophet.

See also 
Last Judgment
Occultation (Islam),  Shi'ite eschatological belief in the concealment and subsequent reemergence of an Imam or Mahdi, who will establish justice and peace on earth in the end of time
Minor Occultation, first period of concealment of the Imam (874–941) in Twelver Shi'ism, during which the Hidden Imam Muhammad al-Mahdi is believed to have communicated regularly with his followers through four successive agents
Major Occultation, second period of concealment of the Imam (941–present) in Twelver Shi'ism, during which the Hidden Imam is believed to be without agent
 (al-Nu'mani), a work on the occultation of the Imam by the Twelver Shi'ite scholar Muhammad ibn Ibrahim al-Nu'mani (died )
 (al-Tusi), a work on the occultation of the Imam by the Twelver Shi'ite scholar Shaykh Tusi (995–1067)
Resurrection of the dead
Second coming

References

Sources 
 
 
 
 
 
 
 
 
 
 

Islamic eschatology
Shia eschatology
Spirituality
Arabic words and phrases
Islamic terminology
Mahdism